Carlos Dumas (born 1904, date of death unknown) was an Argentine tennis player. He competed in the men's singles and doubles events at the 1924 Summer Olympics.

References

External links
 

1904 births
Year of death missing
Argentine male tennis players
Olympic tennis players of Argentina
Tennis players at the 1924 Summer Olympics
Place of birth missing
20th-century Argentine people